CAUSA or Causa can refer to:
 Compañía Aeronáutica Uruguaya S.A., a historic airline company in Uruguay
 CAUSA International, an anti-communist organization in New York
 Causa, a genus of air-breathing land snails
 Causa limeña, a dish in Peruvian cuisine made with potatoes and layered or topped with meat or vegetables